The Kheta is a river in Krasnoyarsk Krai in Russia, left composite of the Khatanga River.

Course
The Kheta is formed by the confluence of the Ayan and Ayakli, both of which originate in the Putorana Plateau. The Kheta freezes up in late September or early October and breaks up in late May or the first half of June. Its main tributaries are the Boyarka, Maymecha, and Boganida.

See also
List of rivers of Russia

References

Rivers of Krasnoyarsk Krai
North Siberian Lowland